The Silco Incident involves the kidnapping of the Belgian-French family Houtekins-Kets by the Libyan government from their yacht Silco in the waters of the Mediterranean Sea on August 1, 1985.

Capture and release
The Belgian part of the family was held for almost five years of captivity in Libya, but were freed after the release of Said Al Nasr (who was convicted in the early 1980s for throwing a hand grenade into a group of Jewish children in Antwerp in the 1980 Antwerp summer camp attack) for the family, in Cairo, Egypt, on January 12, 1991. The French part of the family were released somewhat earlier, when the French government negotiated their freedom with the Libyan government.

See also
List of kidnappings
List of people who disappeared

References

Further reading

1980s missing person cases
1985 in Belgium
Abu Nidal attacks
Formerly missing people
History of the Mediterranean
Hostage taking
Kidnapped Belgian people
Kidnapped French people
Maritime incidents in 1985
Palestinian terrorist incidents in Europe
Terrorist incidents in Europe in 1985
Terrorist incidents in Belgium
Terrorist incidents in Belgium in the 1980s